This is a list of national days of mourning since 2020. It does not include annual remembrance events.

2020

2021

2022

2023

See also 
 National day of mourning
 European Day of Mourning, a similar concept at the EU level

Notes

References 

Death customs
Mourning (2020-)
Lists of disasters
national days of mourning